Norwegian County Road 420 is a Norwegian county road in Vest-Agder and Aust-Agder counties, Norway.

References

420
Transport in Kristiansand